Isidore Mankofsky (September 22, 1931 – March 11, 2021) was an American cinematographer, and was nominated for two Emmys. He is best known for his work on films such as The Muppet Movie (1979) and The Jazz Singer (1980). He shot more than 200 educational movies for Encyclopædia Britannica.

He died at his home in Los Angeles, California in March 2021 at the age of 89.

Selected filmography 
 1970: A.k.a. Cassius Clay
 1971: Werewolves on Wheels
 1973: Scream Blacula Scream
 1974: The Ultimate Thrill
 1977: Lanigan's Rabbi
 1979: The Muppet Movie
 1980: Somewhere in Time
 1980: The Jazz Singer
 1982: In the Custody of Strangers
 1983: Baby Sister
 1983: Quarterback Princess
 1984: Silence of the Heart
 1984: The Burning Bed
 1985: Better off Dead
 1985: Ewoks: The Battle for Endor
 1986: One Crazy Summer
 1988: A Very Brady Christmas
 1988: Clinton and Nadine
 1989: Parent Trap III
 1989: Polly
 1989: Skin Deep
 1991: Love, Lies and Murder
 1992: Afterburn
 1992: Day-O
 1992: Bed of Lies
 1994: Father and Scout
 1994: The Gift of Love
 1995: Out-of-Sync
 1995: The Heidi Chronicles
 1996: She Cried No

Literature 
 Zone, Ray: Isidore Mankofsky in 3-D filmmakers: Conversations with creators of stereoscopic motion pictures, 2005, p. 61-70.
 Alexander, Geoff & Prelinger, Rick: Isidore Mankofsky in Academic Films for the Classroom: A History, Mcfarland & Co Inc., 2010, p. 172-173.
 Fauer, John: Cinematographer Style - The Complete Interviews, Vol. II, American Cinematographer, 2009

References

External links
 

1931 births
2021 deaths
American cinematographers
Artists from New York City
Encyclopædia Britannica
American people of Ukrainian descent